Inzing is a town in the Austrian Federal State Tyrol.

Geography

Location 
Inzing is located in the Inntal between Innsbruck in east and Telfs in west. It lies on the southern bank of the Inn River. In the south of the town you see the Rangger Köpfl, in the north the Zirler Berg.

Neighbour municipalities 
Flaurling, Gries im Sellrain, Hatting, Oberperfuss, Pettnau, Ranggen, Sankt Sigmund im Sellrain, Sellrain, Zirl.

History 
Inzing was first mentioned in a document in 1034. The district Hatting was attached 1974 to Inzing and 1993 as an own commune reconstituted.

Population

Economy 
The industrial district, which is located at the east of the village, includes timber processing.

References

External links

 www.geschichte-tirol.com: Inzing
 Dorfchronik Inzing

Cities and towns in Innsbruck-Land District